The 1937 Paris–Nice was the fifth edition of the Paris–Nice cycle race and was held from 9 March to 14 March 1937. The race started in Paris and finished in Nice. The race was won by Roger Lapébie.

General classification

References

1937
1937 in road cycling
1937 in French sport
March 1937 sports events